Hanggang sa Huling Bala is a 1995 Philippine action film written and directed by Jose N. Carreon. The film stars Lito Lapid, Plinky Recto and Dennis Roldan. It is dubbed as a "Victory Presentation" since it was released by the time Lapid won as governor of Pampanga.

Cast
 Lito Lapid as David
 Plinky Recto as Carmen
 Dennis Roldan as Richard
 Sharmaine Suarez as Roxanne
 CJ Ramos as Butchoy
 Dante Rivero as Mr. Moto
 Dick Israel as Dado
 Rez Cortez as Lt. Rodrigo
 Perla Bautista as Kapitana
 Zandro Zamora as Turo
 Ben Sagmit as Ben Jukebox

References

External links

1995 films
1995 action films
Filipino-language films
Philippine action films
Megavision Films films